Desulfatiferula olefinivorans  is a Gram-negative, sulfate-reducing, long-chain alkene-degrading and motile bacterium from the genus of Desulfatiferula  which has been isolated from oil-polluted sediments from Berre Lagoon in France.

References

External links 
Type strain of Desulfatiferula olefinivorans at BacDive -  the Bacterial Diversity Metadatabase

Desulfobacterales
Bacteria described in 2007